Two ships of the United States Navy have been named USS James Madison, after James Madison the fourth President of the United States:

 , was a revenue cutter launched in 1807 that  captured on 22 August 1812. At a later date, Lord Belmore, of Enniskillen bought her, renamed her Osprey, converted her from schooner to brig rig, armed her, and acquired a letter of marque for her. After the War of 1812 Belmore used Osprey for a family cruise to the Eastern Mediterranean. He sold Osprey to the King of Naples in 1819. She did not become ; that was the American vessel William Bayard.
 , was a nuclear-powered submarine commissioned in 1964 and decommissioned in 1992

See also

References

United States Navy ship names